The 2013 WCHA Men's Ice Hockey Tournament was played between March 15 and March 23, 2013, at six conference arenas and the Xcel Energy Center in Saint Paul, Minnesota. The Wisconsin Badgers defeated the Colorado College Tigers to win their 12th Broadmoor Trophy as the tournament's champions, and was awarded the Western Collegiate Hockey Association's automatic bid to the 2013 NCAA Division I Men's Ice Hockey Tournament.

Format
The first round of the postseason tournament features a best-of-three games format. All twelve conference teams participate in the tournament. Teams are seeded No. 1 through No. 12 according to their final conference standing, with a tiebreaker system used to seed teams with an identical number of points accumulated. The top six seeded teams each earn home ice and host one of the lower seeded teams.

The winners of the first round series advance to the Xcel Energy Center for the WCHA Final Five, the collective name for the quarterfinal, semifinal, and championship rounds. The Final Five uses a single-elimination format. Teams are re-seeded No. 1 through No. 6 according to the final regular season conference standings, with the top two teams automatically advancing to the semifinals.  All Final Five games will be broadcast by Fox Sports North and carried by Root Sports Rocky Mountain and Fox College Sports Central.

Conference standings
Note: GP = Games played; W = Wins; L = Losses; T = Ties; PTS = Points; GF = Goals For; GA = Goals Against

Bracket
Teams are reseeded after the first round

Note: * denotes overtime periods

Results

First round
All times are local.

(1) St. Cloud State vs. (12) Alaska Anchorage

(2) Minnesota vs. (11) Bemidji State

(3) North Dakota vs. (10) Michigan Tech

(4) Wisconsin vs. (9) Minnesota-Duluth

(5) Denver vs. (8) Colorado College

(6) Minnesota State vs. (7) Nebraska-Omaha

Quarterfinals
All times are local (UTC−5).

(4) Wisconsin vs. (6) Minnesota State

(3) North Dakota vs. (8) Colorado College

Semifinals
All times are local (UTC−5).

(1) St. Cloud State vs. (4) Wisconsin

(2) Minnesota vs. (8) Colorado College

Championship
All times are local (UTC−5).

(4) Wisconsin vs. (8) Colorado College

Tournament awards

All-Tournament Team
F Tyler Barnes (Wisconsin)
F Nic Kerdiles* (Wisconsin)
F Rylan Schwartz (Colorado College)
D John Ramage (Wisconsin)
D Peter Stoykewych (Colorado College)
G Joel Rumpel (Wisconsin)
* Most Valuable Player(s)

References

External links
Western Collegiate Hockey Association
WCHA Men's First Round Playoff Pairings Set
FOX Sports North to Televise 2013 Red Baron Final Five
2013 WCHA Tournament Information
2013 Red Baron WCHA Final Five

WCHA Men's Ice Hockey Tournament
WCHA Men's Ice Hockey Tournament